Jesse Singal is an American journalist. He has written for publications including New York magazine, The New York Times and The Atlantic. Singal also publishes a newsletter on Substack and hosts a podcast, Blocked and Reported, with journalist Katie Herzog.

Much of Singal's writing deals with the social sciences, and he previously edited New York magazine's behavioral-science vertical, "Science of Us". In 2021, he published a book, The Quick Fix, about the failings of popular psychology. Singal's writing on transgender issues has attracted controversy, particularly in his 2018 cover story for The Atlantic, "When Children Say They're Trans".

Singal's political orientation has often been described as liberal but "heterodox", though he has expressed an aversion to the latter term as a descriptor of his work.

Biography
Singal is one of three sons born to Sydney L. (née Altman) (1949–2021) and Bruce A. Singal. Both of his parents were attorneys. He received a master's degree in public affairs from Princeton's Woodrow Wilson School of Public and International Affairs. He is of Jewish descent and lives in Brooklyn.

Writing about transgender issues

Singal has been described as one of the most prominent journalists working in the area of transgender issues. His work has been negatively received by prominent members of the trans community due to the nature of his reporting on detransition and transition regret.

2018 Atlantic article
Singal wrote the cover story for the July/August 2018 issue of The Atlantic. Originally published under the title "When a Child Says She's Trans", the online version was later retitled "When Children Say They're Trans". The long-form piece includes profiles of several adolescents who identify or previously identified as transgender, interviews with youth gender clinicians, and reviews of some of the studies, statistics, and protocols related to youth transition. In a follow-up, The Atlantic published four letters from parents of transgender children reacting to Singal's article with a mixture of criticism and praise. Alexandria Neason, writing for the Columbia Journalism Review, stated that despite being fact-checked, the story was considered transphobic by many readers, journalists and activists, and suggested that more diversity in editorial oversight could have averted the problem.

Among the controversial aspects of the article was how much it was focused on the stories of multiple adolescents who had desisted or detransitioned — that is, reverted to identifying with their assigned gender at birth, either before or after undergoing physical transition. In the article, Singal acknowledges that the stories of detransitioners are sometimes viewed with skepticism or suspicion by the trans community, in part because they have been used by conservative media to further misleading narratives. Alex Barasch, writing in Slate, faulted the article for not including the story of "a single happy, well-adjusted trans teen" in its first 9,000 words. This complaint was echoed in one of the parent-penned letters published by The Atlantic, which said that the two stories of happily-transitioned teens were "buried deep in the article". Barasch also criticized Singal for failing to include the stories of individuals who had detransitioned for reasons other than a realization that they were not trans, such as social stigma. Some commentators questioned whether it was appropriate for Singal, a cisgender man, to write on this topic, rather than a trans writer.

Subsequent controversies
In March 2021, Singal was listed on GLAAD's "Accountability Project", which the organization described as serving to document "anti-LGBTQ words and actions from politicians, commentators, organization leaders, journalists and other public figures". Singal responded on Substack, stating that his inclusion on the list was based on "previously disproven internet scuttlebutt". Singal was supported by sex columnist Dan Savage, who derided what he described as a "long & dishonest campaign" against Singal, and urged readers to listen to Singal's interview of a youth-gender clinician before judging him as transphobic.

Podcast

Since March 2020, Singal has hosted the podcast Blocked and Reported with Katie Herzog, a journalist based in Washington state. The podcast focuses on internet culture war controversies. According to its website, "Journalists Katie Herzog and Jesse Singal scour the internet for its craziest, silliest, most sociopathic content, part of an obsessive and ill-conceived attempt to extract kernels of meaning and humanity from a landscape of endless raging dumpster fires. (And sometimes they talk about other stuff, too.)" Herzog and Singal have both been described as politically liberal, but "heterodox" and "woke-skeptic." Herzog was also the subject of online ostracism (characterized in the New York Times as an attempted "cancellation") as a result of a controversial 2017 article she wrote for Seattle weekly The Stranger about people who have undergone detransition, halting or reversing their gender transition.

Within three months of the podcast's debut, it had more than 1,400 financial supporters through Patreon, collectively paying more than $8,000 per month. As of July 2021, this had increased to approximately 5,600 patrons and $37,000 per month.  In October 2021, both the hosting and patronage provider was migrated to Substack.

Book
Singal's debut book, The Quick Fix: Why Fad Psychology Can’t Cure Our Social Ills, was published in April 2021. The book examines a number of popular psychology fads such as positive psychology, power posing, and the implicit-association test which, according to Singal, turned out to have weak empirical support or reproducibility, or which were exaggerated into stronger claims which are "scientifically questionable but sexy and exciting". The book examines the replication crisis in social sciences, and some of the underlying causes such as p-hacking, and suggests remedies for "how both individuals and institutions can do a better job of resisting" exaggerated pop psychology.

Writing for National Review, Michael M. Rosen called the book "engaging and persuasive", and wrote that it was based on "rigorous research and thoughtful interviews". An anonymous review in Publishers Weekly called the book "impassioned yet disappointing", complaining that its presentation of scientific details was too convoluted for lay readers.

References

External links

American science journalists
American podcasters
Year of birth missing (living people)
Living people
21st-century American journalists
Princeton School of Public and International Affairs alumni
21st-century American male writers
American male journalists
Jewish American journalists